Xenophonus hirtus was formerly the name of a species of beetles in the family Carabidae, the only species of the genus Xenophonus. The species name is currently invalid, and the genus name is invalid or doubtful.

References

Harpalinae
Monotypic Carabidae genera